Baetylus (also Baetyl, Bethel, or Betyl, from Semitic bet el "house of god"; compare Bethel, Beit El) are sacred stones that were supposedly endowed with life, or gave access to a deity. According to ancient sources, at least some of these objects of worship were meteorites, which were dedicated to the gods or revered as symbols of the gods themselves.

Other accounts suggest that contact with them could give access to epiphanic experiences of the deity. The baetyl has been described by Wendy Doniger as "the parent form for altars and iconic statuary". In general the baetyl was believed to have something inherent in its own nature that made it sacred, rather than becoming sacred by human intervention, such as carving it into a cult image. Some baetyls were left in their natural state, but others were worked on by sculptors. The exact definition of a baetyl, as opposed to other types of sacred stones, "cult stones" and so on, is rather vague both in ancient and modern sources. In some contexts, especially relating to Nabataean sites like Petra, the term is commonly used for shaped and carved stelae.

They had a role in most regions of the ancient Near East and Greek and Roman religion, as well as other cultures.

Examples

With various other sites around the Mediterranean, they were a feature of the Neolithic temple site of Tas-Silġ and other sites on Malta and Gozo. The Hittites worshiped sacred stones called Huwasi stones.

In the Hebrew Bible, Bethel (meaning "House of God"), is where Jacob had his vision of Jacob's ladder. Coming upon the place at nightfall, the Book of Genesis tells the reader that he laid his head on a stone, and had the vision while sleeping, then:

 

In Minoan religion, it has been suggested that rubbing, lying, or sleeping on a baetyl could summon a vision of the god, an event which appears to be depicted on some gold Minoan seal rings, where the stones are large oval boulders. A small serpentinite boulder was excavated very close to the Palaikastro Kouros, the only known Minoan cult image, destroyed around 1450 BC; perhaps it was its baetyl.

In the Phoenician mythology related by Sanchuniathon, one of the sons of Uranus was named Baetylus. The worship of baetyls was widespread in the Phoenician colonies, including Tyre, Sidon, and Carthage, even after the adoption of Christianity, and was denounced by Augustine of Hippo.

A similar practice survives today with the Kaaba's Black Stone, which was sacred to the polytheists before Islam.

Ancient Greece and Rome
In ancient Greek religion and mythology, the term was specially applied to the Omphalos of Delphi ("navel"), the stone supposed to have been swallowed by Cronus (who feared misfortune from his own children) in mistake for his infant son Zeus, for whom it had been substituted by Gaea. This stone was carefully preserved at Delphi, anointed with oil every day and on festive occasions covered with raw wool.

In Rome, there was the stone effigy of Cybele, called , that had been ceremoniously brought from Pessinus in Asia Minor in 204 BC. The emperor Elagabalus who reigned from 218 until 222 (and was probably a teenager for all his reign) came from Syria and was already the hereditary high priest of the cult of the god Elagabalus there. Once made emperor he brought the god's baetyl to Rome with great ceremony, and built the Elagabalium to house it. It seems to have been a conical meteorite.
 
In some cases an attempt was made to give a more regular form to the original shapeless stone: thus Apollo Agyieus was represented by a conical pillar with a pointed end, Zeus Meilichius in the form of a pyramid.

According to Tacitus, the simulacrum of the goddess at the temple of Aphrodite Paphia at her mythological birthplace at Paphos, on Cyprus, was a rounded object, approximately conical or shaped like a meta (a turning post on a Roman circus) but "the reason for this" he noted, "is obscure". 

Other famous baetylic idols were those in the temples of Zeus Casius at Seleucia Pieria, and of Zeus Teleios at Tegea. Even in the declining years of paganism, these idols still retained their significance, as is shown by the attacks upon them by ecclesiastical writers.

See also
 Asherah pole, Canaanite sacred tree or pole honouring Asherah, consort of El
 Bema and bimah, elevated platform
 Bethel (god)
 Benben 
 Black Stone, the venerated stone at Kaaba
 Ceremonial pole
 High place, raised place of worship
 List of Greek mythological figures
 Kami, central objects of worship for Shinto, some of which are natural phenomena and natural objects such as stones.
 Lingam, abstract representation of the Hindu deity Shiva
 Banalinga, stones naturally worn to ovoid shapes in river beds in India
 Pole worship
Shaligram, river-bed fossils in India, considered holy
 Stele, stone or wooden slab erected as a monument
 Turbah, small clay or earthen slabs used by Twelver Muslims

Notes

References

Further reading
"Baetyl" Jona Lendering, Livius.org
 Uta Kron: "Heilige Steine", in: Kotinos. Festschrift für Erika Simon, Mainz 1992, S. 56–70, 

Greek mythology
Middle Eastern mythology
Meteorites in culture
Sacred rocks